The Muttenhorn is a mountain in the Lepontine Alps, located on the border between the cantons of Valais and Uri. At 3,099 metres above sea level, it overlooks the south side of Furka Pass. A glacier named Muttgletscher lies over its north-western flanks, above 2,600 metres.

The summit is also distinguished by the name Gross Muttenhorn, with other lower summits being named Chli Muttenhorn (3,024 metres) and Stotzig Muttenhorn (3,062 metres). The whole range is referred to as the Muttenhörner.

References

External links
Muttenhorn on Summitpost

Mountains of the Alps
Mountains of Switzerland
Mountains of Valais
Mountains of the canton of Uri
Uri–Valais border
Lepontine Alps